Ludvig Leif Sadi Rovsing, née Qvist (27 July 1887 – 17 June 1977) was a Danish tennis player. He competed in two events at the 1912 Summer Olympics. 

As an openly gay man, he was excluded by Danish sports authorities who banned his participation in several sport tournaments.

References

1887 births
1977 deaths
Danish male tennis players
Olympic tennis players of Denmark
Tennis players at the 1912 Summer Olympics
Sportspeople from Copenhagen
Danish LGBT sportspeople
Danish gay men